Lohuecotitan is an extinct genus of titanosaurian sauropod dinosaur which lived during the Late Cretaceous in Spain. The only species known in the genus is Lohuecotitan pandafilandi, described and named in 2016.

Discovery and naming

The fossil remains of Lohuecotitan were discovered in the site of Lo Hueco, Fuentes, Cuenca, which is part of the Villalba de la Sierra Formation. The formation dates from the Upper Campanian to the Lower Maastrichtian, and would have represented a muddy coastal floodplain. Multiple partial sauropod skeletons have been discovered at this site, with the teeth and braincases recovered representing at least two distinct types of titanosaur. The holotype specimen of Lohuecotitan, HUE-EC-01, is a disarticulated partial skeleton consisting of cervical, dorsal, sacral, and caudal vertebrae, ribs, an ulna, both ischia, a pubis, a femur, a fibula, and a tibia, along with some indeterminate remains.

The name of Lohuecotitan combines a reference to the type locality with titan (which refers to the Greek titans). The specific name, pandafilandi, is derived from the name of a giant, Pandafilando de la fosca vista, in the novel Don Quixote.

Description

Lohuecotitan was recognized by its describers as having a number of unique characteristics (autapomorphies) not seen in other titanosaurs. In the dorsal vertebrae, the edges of the postspinal laminae extend outwards. In the first several caudal vertebrae, the medial spinoprezygapophyseal and spinopostzygapophyseal laminae respectively connect to the prespinal and postspinal laminae on the bottom surface. In addition, due to the way that the prespinal and postspinal laminae project upwards, the neural spine of the vertebra appears to be V-shaped from the side, and resemble a Greek cross in cross-section. Each middle caudal vertebra has two roughened structures that extend from the top of the back face onto the top surface of the vertebra. Finally, the bottom portion of each half of the haemal arches in the posterior caudal vertebrae is split fully into two articular facets. These traits form a unique combination not seen in other titanosaurs, along with the centrodiapophyseal laminae being widened on the top and bottom edges in the front and middle dorsal vertebrae (as also seen in Saltasaurus), and a rounded protrusion being present between the front and side trochanters of the fibula (also seen in Jainosaurus).

A number of the bones of Lohuecotitan were internally pneumatized, including the cervical vertebrae, sacral vertebrae, and ilium. As is common in somphospondylans, the pneumatic fossae on the cervical vertebrae are shallow; this was also the case in the dorsal vertebrae. The cervical and dorsal vertebrae are opisthocoelous; the caudal vertebrae were procoelous (a characteristic common in Lithostrotia). The seventh and eighth tail vertebrae are fused together; this probably represents a pathology. As in other titanosauriforms, the dorsal ribs are compressed and blade-like. The ulna was robust, and the bottom surface of the tibia was oval-shaped, as is common in titanosaurs.

Classification
Lohuecotitan was in 2016 recovered as a lithostrotian titanosaur, more derived than Malawisaurus. Its position among the lithostrotians is supported by the sharp angle of its zygapophyseal articulations. The consensus of the 20 most parsimonious phylogenetic trees recovered is shown below.

See also
2016 in paleontology

References

Titanosaurs
Late Cretaceous dinosaurs of Europe
Campanian life
Cretaceous Spain
Fossils of Spain
Fossil taxa described in 2016